Moya Cannon (born 1956) is an Irish writer and poet with seven published collections, the most recent being Collected Poems (Carcanet Press, Manchester, 2021).

Life
Born in Dunfanaghy, County Donegal, Ireland, Moya Cannon studied history and politics at University College Dublin and at Corpus Christi College, Cambridge. She then moved to Galway where she worked as a teacher. For several years she taught in a special school for adolescent traveller children. In addition, she taught courses in creative writing at the National University of Ireland, Galway and was co-director of The International Writers’ Course at NUIG.

Her Collected Poems has been published by Carcanet Press, Manchester (2021). Her sixth collection, Donegal Tarantella, was issued by Carcanet Press in 2019.

In her poems, history, archaeology, prehistoric art, geology and music figure as gateways to deeper understanding of our relationship with the earth and with our past. Migration is a core theme, the migrations of birds, of people, of culture.

Her first published collection Oar (Salmon Poetry, 1990, Poolbeg Press, 1994, and Gallery Press, 2000) won the 1991 Brendan Behan Memorial Award.

She has been invited to read in Ireland, Europe, in the Americas, North and South; in Japan and India. Bilingual selections of her work have been published in Spanish, Portuguese, and German. 

A recipient of the O'Shaughnessy Award from the University of St. Thomas, St Paul, Minnesota in 2001; she was Heimbold Professor of Irish Studies at Villanova University in 2011. She has been editor of Poetry Ireland Review and is a member of Aosdána.

Bibliography 

 Donegal Tarantella (2019)
 Keats Lives (2015)
 Hands (2011)
 Carrying the Songs (2007)
 Winter Birds (2005)
 The Parchment Boat (1997)
 Oar (1990)

Translations 

 Aves De Invierno Y Otros Poemas (2015)
 Dos Poetas Irlandesas (2018)
 Ein Privates Land (2017)
 Melodias Migratorias (2017)

References

External links
 https://www.carcanet.co.uk/cgi-bin/indexer?owner_id=860
https://web.archive.org/web/20110716230624/http://www.ifacca.org/international_news/2004/02/08/aosdana-general-assembly/
 https://web.archive.org/web/20090717082354/http://www.irishwriters-online.com/moyacannon.html
 https://web.archive.org/web/20090105182909/http://www.gallerypress.com/Authors/Mcannon/mcannon.html
 View readings in the Irish Poetry Reading Archive, UCD Digital Library, University College Dublin
 Interview with Moya Cannon by Patrick O'Donnell as part of the O'Shaughnessy Poetry Award by the University of St. Thomas Center for Irish Studies, St. Paul, Minnesota (March 27, 2001)

20th-century Irish poets
Aosdána members
1956 births
Living people
Irish women poets
People from Dunfanaghy
Alumni of University College Dublin
20th-century Irish women writers
21st-century Irish poets
21st-century Irish women writers